Chamatkar is a 1992 Indian Hindi-language fantasy comedy film directed by Rajiv Mehra. The film stars Naseeruddin Shah, Shah Rukh Khan, Urmila Matondkar in pivotal roles. As of 2016, the rights of this film are owned by Khan's Red Chillies Entertainment.

Plot
Sunder Srivastava is a young graduate. His main ambition in life is to fulfill his father's dream of starting a school on his half-acre property in his village, though he has no funds to execute his plans. Sunder's childhood friend Prem, a seasoned conman in Mumbai, convinces the gullible Sunder to a mortgage. When Sunder comes to Mumbai, he is first tricked and loses his luggage, then pick-pocketed and loses his money. He then finds that Prem tricked him and fled to Dubai with his money. Sunder is forced to take shelter in a cemetery. Sunder starts cursing his stars and venting his anger. A voice responds to him and a surprised Sunder asks the person to identify himself. The source of the voice, who cannot be seen, is surprised and asks Sunder whether the latter can really hear him.

Sunder realizes that he has been talking with a ghost and panics. The ghost suddenly becomes visible to Sunder and introduces himself as Amar Kumar alias Marco. Marco tells Sunder that only he can help Sunder and vice versa. Marco tells his story. Marco was an underworld gangster who fell in love with one Savitri Kaul, daughter of one Mr. Kaul. Savitri declined to marry him if he did not change his ways. To show that he was serious, Marco resolved to give up the crime. This did not bode well for his protégé Kunta, who wanted to become as big as Marco himself. On his wedding night, Marco was kidnapped and killed by Kunta, after which he was buried in the cemetery. Marco tells Sunder that many crimes taking place in the city under his name are actually done by Kunta and his minions.

Marco tells Sunder that due to his sins, he cannot attain redemption. Marco was foretold that only his savior would be able to see and hear him, so Sunder has to help him. Sunder declines, but Marco surprises him by reminding him of his dream, about which Sunder had not told a thing to Marco. Marco tells him that he wants to see Savitri and Mr. Kaul. He also tells that he cannot touch or harm anybody until a time comes. Marco manages to get Sunder a position as a cricket coach in a school run by Mr. Kaul. Marco is angered when he finds out that after his murder, Kunta and his goons came to the Kaul household and told Savitri that Marco was alive and had fled India never to come back, suggesting that Marco only married her in order to sleep with her. Kunta had told them that Marco wanted Savitri and her father to hand over the ownership documents for his hotel to Kunta, but Savitri refused to hand them over unless Marco himself came to ask for them. Kunta then tried to rape Savitri, but was stopped when her father broke down, promising to give them the documents. Hearing all of this, Marco is furious and vows revenge. He is grieved to learn that Savitri died soon after that, but he is overjoyed when he learns that he has a daughter with Savitri called Mala.

Sunder and Marco also find out that the school lacks funding and that Kunta is trying to usurp its land. Mala and Sunder start falling in love. Marco helps and keeps Kunta's goons away. Later, Marco shows a secret room to Sunder where he had kept all his loot. The room was not known to Kunta or anybody else, so Marco proposes that an anonymous donation is made, which will be more than enough to save the school and help Sunder. However, due to their oversight, Kunta finds out the location of the room, and Marco loses all his money. Marco refers to Kunta as "Woh Kunta saala" ("that rogue Kunta"). In a desperate bid, Marco steals some money and bets to double the money. Sunder is held responsible for the theft, although no proof is present. Marco tells the truth to Sunder, and they have a fall-out.

Sunder agrees to a cricket match between his team and a team headed by Kunta's nephew: if they win the game, they will win funds to keep the school. Initially, Sunder's team is losing, but Marco then steps into the game (still invisible to everyone), sabotages the opponent team and helps Sunder's team, leading Sunder's team to succeed massively.

After a brief meeting between Sunder and Kunta prior to the start of the match where Sunder mentions Marco's ghost, Kunta becomes suspicious; especially when Sunder reveals the truth to IG Tripathi (formerly Inspector in Marco's era). During the match, he abducts Sunder along with Mala and buries them alive in the very place he had buried Marco. Marco manages to lead the police to the cemetery where a fight erupts between Kunta and his goons on the one hand, Marco, Mala, Sunder and the policemen on the other. After succeeding in beating up the goons, Marco starts to strangle Kunta with a rope while Sunder forces Kunta to confess his role in Marco's murder. Marco then pushes Kunta into the empty grave and as he is about to kill him with a large rock, Mala calls out for him to stop, calling him "father" and entreating not to kill and sully his hands with blood because of Kunta. On hearing this, Marco immediately relents and lets Kunta live.

Finally, Sunder succeeds in his mission. Sunder and Mala marry, with Marco attending the wedding. At the wedding, a ray of light falls upon Marco who then ascends to heaven, although not before asking for "a minute" to entreat the viewer to do the right thing while they are alive, because they may not have the chance to set things right after death.

Cast
Naseeruddin Shah as Amar / Marco
Shah Rukh Khan as Sundar Shrivastav
Urmila Matondkar as Mala 
Shammi Kapoor as Mr. Kaul
Deven Verma as Inspector P.K. Sant
Tinu Anand as Kunta
Ashutosh Gowariker as Monty
Ali Asgar as Rakesh
Malvika Tiwari as Savitri Kaul
Rakesh Bedi as Moti
Johnny Lever as Battery Clerk / Cricket Commentator
 Suhas Khandke as Raj Mehta, Hotel Owner
Anjana Mumtaz as Mrs. Kaushalya Mehta
Anjan Srivastav as Inspector I.M. Tripathi
Shreechand Makhija as Dayal College Principal
Ravi Patwardhan as Village Zamindar
Avinash Kharshikar as Prem
Arun Bakshi as Umpire
Gavin Packard as Gunga
Achyut Potdar as Railway TC

Soundtrack
The music was composed by Anu Malik, and lyrics by Anand Bakshi.

Track listing

See also
 List of ghost films

References

External links

 Chamatkar Full Movie at Filmywrep

1990s Hindi-language films
1992 films
Films scored by Anu Malik
Films set in Mumbai
Films about cricket in India
1992 comedy films
Indian ghost films
Indian remakes of American films